Climat Québec is a minor political party in the Canadian province of Quebec founded in 2021 by former Marois cabinet minister and leader of the Bloc Québécois Martine Ouellet.

The party contested the Marie-Victorin by-election in April 2022, triggered by the resignation of Catherine Fournier, with Ouellet as its candidate.  She received 1.9% of the vote, earning 6th place of 12 candidates in the by-election.

Ideology
Similarly to the Parti Québécois, which Ouellet was once part of, and Québec solidaire, Climat Québec positions itself on the centre-left of the Canadian political spectrum but intends to focus on the climate crisis and secession of Quebec from Canada.

References

Secessionist organizations in Canada
Pro-independence parties
Quebec sovereignty movement
Republicanism in Canada
Provincial political parties in Quebec
Political parties established in 2021
2021 establishments in Quebec